Broomfield is a suburb on the western side of Christchurch city.

The suburb is named for an estate farmed by Rev. James Wilson (1813–1886), which he named after a place near Leith in Scotland. The estate was subdivided from 1908, and the suburb was named in the 1970s. Most of the housing has been built since 2010.

 runs through the suburb, and  forms its northwestern boundary.

Demographics

Broomfield had a population of 2,571 at the 2018 New Zealand census, an increase of 525 people (25.7%) since the 2013 census, and an increase of 732 people (39.8%) since the 2006 census. There were 942 households. There were 1,221 males and 1,350 females, giving a sex ratio of 0.9 males per female. The median age was 36.1 years (compared with 37.4 years nationally), with 519 people (20.2%) aged under 15 years, 546 (21.2%) aged 15 to 29, 1,083 (42.1%) aged 30 to 64, and 426 (16.6%) aged 65 or older.

Ethnicities were 64.8% European/Pākehā, 13.3% Māori, 7.6% Pacific peoples, 23.2% Asian, and 2.6% other ethnicities (totals add to more than 100% since people could identify with multiple ethnicities).

The proportion of people born overseas was 27.8%, compared with 27.1% nationally.

Although some people objected to giving their religion, 45.6% had no religion, 40.6% were Christian, 1.6% were Hindu, 2.6% were Muslim, 1.2% were Buddhist and 2.2% had other religions.

Of those at least 15 years old, 354 (17.3%) people had a bachelor or higher degree, and 477 (23.2%) people had no formal qualifications. The median income was $28,400, compared with $31,800 nationally. The employment status of those at least 15 was that 1,011 (49.3%) people were employed full-time, 234 (11.4%) were part-time, and 96 (4.7%) were unemployed.

References

Suburbs of Christchurch
Populated places in Canterbury, New Zealand